Equational may refer to:
 Equative, a construction in linguistics
 something pertaining to equations, in mathematics
 something pertaining to equality, in logic

See also 
 
 Equation (disambiguation)
 Equality (disambiguation)